Michael Edward Lowry (March 8, 1939 – May 1, 2017) was an American politician who served as the 20th governor of Washington from 1993 to 1997. His political career ended abruptly following a sexual misconduct allegation made against him by his deputy press secretary, Susanne Albright. A member of the Democratic Party, Lowry served as a United States Representative from Washington's 7th congressional district from 1979 to 1989.

Early life
Lowry was born and raised in St. John, Washington,  son of Helen (nee White) and Robert Lowry. He graduated from Washington State University in 1962.

Political career
Lowry had a brief career working for the Washington State Senate and as a lobbyist for Group Health Cooperative, before being elected to the King County Council in 1975. He was elected to the United States House of Representatives from Washington's Seventh Congressional District in 1978, where he served until 1989.

Lowry twice ran unsuccessfully for the United States Senate. In a 1983 special election, he was defeated by Republican former Governor Dan Evans, then an appointed Senator and the incumbent, in a race to replace Democrat Henry "Scoop" Jackson. In 1988, he lost to Slade Gorton, also a Republican, in a close race. Lowry then began working at Seattle University and at an environmental group.

Governor of Washington (1993–1997)
Lowry was elected governor in 1992 and served for a single term (to date, he is the last governor of Washington state to serve only one term). His principal policy initiative was a statewide system of health insurance with premiums based on ability to pay. He chose not to run for reelection due to a sexual harassment scandal in which his deputy press secretary, Susanne Albright, accused him of making inappropriate remarks and fondling her. He was an unsuccessful candidate for Commissioner of Public Lands in 2000, and was later active in building affordable housing for Washington's migrant farm workers.

Personal life

Lowry married Mary Carlson in 1968, and they had a daughter. He died from complications of a stroke on May 1, 2017, at the age of 78.

During Lowry's career, he was often compared to Yasser Arafat by both media and political opponents in the state of Washington, due to a perceived similarity in physical appearance between the two. According to some reports, Lowry shaved off a beard he formerly sported specifically to avoid comparisons.

References

External links

Congressional Papers at the University of Washington library
Oral history interview with Mike Lowry, 2006 Seattle Civil Rights and Labor History Project

|-

|-

|-

1939 births
2017 deaths
20th-century American politicians
Candidates in the 1988 United States elections
Candidates in the 2000 United States elections
Democratic Party members of the United States House of Representatives from Washington (state)
Democratic Party governors of Washington (state)
King County Councillors
People from Whitman County, Washington
Place of death missing
Washington State University alumni